NEXUS: The Kingdom of the Winds, alternately known as Nexus TK or simply Nexus, is a pay to play MMORPG, currently run in the United States by Kru Interactive.  Nexus began as a US version of the Korean game 바람의 나라 (Baramue Nara, or simply Baram) developed by NEXON Inc. of Korea, and is loosely based on Korean mythology and on a series of graphic novels by an artist named Kim Jin.  Development of Baram began in Korea in 1994 and the game was released on April 5, 1996. One year later, it also entered beta in the United States, going commercial in 1998. In 2005, the US subsidiary  of NEXON changed its name to Kru Interactive and took over running Nexus, Dark Ages, and Shattered Galaxy as an independent company. Most of the employees of the subsidiary were laid off but the management remained the same as it was when the company was a subsidiary of NEXON.

A few features that distinguish Nexus from other MMORPGs are its 2D tile graphics, intense player involvement, a central storyline, and its manhwa-like style. The highly popular game Lineage was based on a fork of the Nexus server software; its developer, Jake Song, was one of the original developers of Baram. Nexon pioneered distributed game servers in 1999 and set a record of 12,263 simultaneous users in a single world.

Setting

NexusTK is set in a land similar, geographically, to the Three Kingdoms of Korea, which existed between the 1st century BC and 6th century AD.  Other lands such as Han and Ilbon, though not present in the game itself, are often referenced.  In addition to the three kingdoms, there are nine villages in which a player may live.  Three exist for each kingdom, containing houses which players may rent for a fee. Homes may be customized as a player sees fit using "floor plans" offered for homes of different sizes.

Koguryo
Koguryo is loosely based on an historical kingdom of Korea (Goguryeo) and was the first cultural center of NexusTK.  Koguryo, whose capital city is Kugnae, is home to the Chongun, Spy, Merchant, Diviner, and Monk player subpaths. Kugnae is the largest city in the Nexus.  King Dongmyeong of Koguryo, also known by his birth name Jumong, was the founding monarch of Koguryo, the northernmost of the Three Kingdoms of Korea. The capital city of Koguryo is Kugnae.  The Kingdom is now ruled by King Mu-Hyool, son of the late King Yuri (son of Jumong), and several clans reside within the Kingdom and swear loyalty to King Mhul. These include (chronologically), SunMoon Clan, Bear Clan, Enigma Clan, Oceana Clan, Destiny Clan and Tiger Clan. The Kingdom also is home to the Royal Koguryian Army and the Royal Ministry of Koguryo. The official call of the Koguryians is "Onwards, Azure Koguryo".

Buya
The Empire of Buya is loosely based upon the historical kingdom of Buyeo.  Onjo, the youngest son of Jumong, was the founding monarch of Baekje or the Empire of Buya (including Buya itself). It is currently ruled by Emperor SenShi and his daughter Lasahn. In NexusTK history, it was a small village that grew into a flourishing empire. It is ruled by Queen Lasahn. Several clans swear their loyalty to Queen Lasahn, including (chronologically), Heavens Clan, Phoenix Clan, LostKingdom Clan, Dharma Clan and SanSin Clan. The Empire is also home to the Buyan Imperial Army and the Imperial Ministry of Buya.

Nagnang
The Kingdom of Nagnang was ruled by the late Prince Kija, who was supported by the Legion of Nagnang (Nagnang Army). But sadly he was murdered and the Sovereign Ministry of Nagnang and his brother who is the last prince of the Royal Family ChaeRi, was running the lands for some time before being dethroned in The Summer of Hyul 100. By an Evil Powerful Tribe. This Evil Powerful  Tribe has tried killing King Mhul of Koguryo. They're the ones controlling Nagnang currently. The Shaman subpath resides in Nagnang along with several clans of its own including Alizarin, Covenant (formally the Nagnang Army), Forsaken, K'urimja, Pegasus, Silla, and Viper.

Wilderness
The Wilderness is a broad expanse owned by no one. It is home to a large number of creatures, locations, and natural resources. The Barbarian, Geomancer, Druid and Ranger subpaths reside here.

Character development

NexusTK has a flexible character development system. There are four "basic" paths to choose from: warrior, rogue, mage, and poet. Each of which has one non-player-controlled subpath and three player-controlled subpaths. When a player reaches a certain level, he may also choose one of three alignments; Kwi-Sin, Ohaeng or Ming-ken (symbolizing death, balance or life respectively).

The four basic paths players are able to choose from each have their own styles of play. Warriors and rogues, while both are damage dealers, work in slightly different ways. For example, rogues may go invisible while warriors cannot but warriors have the ability to "overflow" their attacks to multiple monsters while rogues cannot. Mages are excellent for soloing with their ability to paralyze creatures from moving. The poet class has as its disposal the most powerful healing spells as well as buffs and debuffs to strengthen allies and weaken creatures.

Additionally—each basic path has 3 PC (Player-controlled) subpaths and 1 NPC (non-player controlled) path.
Warriors:  NPC:  Chung-Ryong    PC:  Barbarian, Chongun, and Do
Rogues:    NPC:  Baekho         PC:  Merchant, Spy, and Ranger
Mages:     NPC:  Ju Jak         PC:  Diviner, Shaman, and Geomancer
Poets:     NPC:  Hyun-moo       PC:  Monk, Druid, and Muse

The player can choose a totem animal. It's a supernatural creatures who are patrons of the primary paths. They are Chung Ryong (blue dragon), Ju Jak (red fire bird), Baekho (white tiger), and Hyun Moo (black turtle). They are based on Four Symbols in the Chinese constellations. Chung Ryong means the Azure Dragon, Ju Jak means the Vermilion Bird, Baekho means the White Tiger, and Hyun Moo means the Black Tortoise.

Leveling up is not the only aspect of character development, however. Nexus:TKOTW has a very tight-knit social structure, and has many different social cliques. Sometimes a positive, sometimes a negative, Nexus′ community has been the lifeblood of the game to many. Unlike many other MMORPGs, in NexusTK most players are known by others and are treated with a general amount of respect by the average player.

Like in nearly every MMORPG, there are different armor dyes, armor types, hair choices, hair colors, and character models to choose from. There are also many different types of weapons, some players choose to wear items that assemble a certain 'look' that defines who that character is. Others simply choose to wear functional outfits, and still others choose to display wealth by having many expensive items on.

Unlike many other RPGs, character development does not end when the level cap (level 99) is reached. Players can continue to hunt and gain experience, which can then be traded in for permanent gains in health, mana, strength (with cap), magic (with cap) and agility (with cap) capacities.

Social and political structure
Perhaps the most distinctive feature of Nexus TK is its tightly knit social architecture and ability for players to rise to prominence in important community roles.  Guilds (known as clans) cannot be freely created, and come into being through a months-long process in which the clan's leadership and growing membership pass numerous in-game trials to prove their worth.  Since the game went online, only 19 clans have been founded.  Clans are rewarded with custom locations, NPCs and items in-game.  Each class (known as a path) has three player-led sub-paths, each with its own council of dedicated players.  Like clans, sub-paths have special abilities, locations, NPCs, and items, and are entirely player-controlled.

Even the game itself is partially player-run. There are a very small number of Game Masters (often one) in charge of the game, and a much larger number of staff-elected players known as "Archons" controlling game affairs. Players also run the in-game justice system, a class-based tutelage system, in-game PVP events, and even, to a small extent, the kingdoms themselves.  It is not rare for prominent players to hold such positions for as long as a decade.  Players in positions of power and players who are not often find themselves at odds, and throughout the game's history there have been many accusations of nepotism and unfair treatment.  All community roles are somewhat heavily steeped in roleplay within the numerous interwoven player-written canons for each clan and subpath.

Reception
, the game has over  registered users worldwide. It is the longest-running graphic MMORPG, having been in service for over 24 years.

References

External links

Official site
 Nexus: The Kingdom Of The Winds
 Kru Interactive
 NexusTk Facebook

Fan Websites
 Nexus Atlas
 Stat Addict
 Ixeus' formula page

1996 video games
Massively multiplayer online role-playing games
Nexon games
Video games developed in South Korea
Windows games
Windows-only games